The 2008 Sudan Premier League was the 37th edition of the highest club level football competition in Sudan. The competition started on February 21 with Al-Ittihad (Wad Medani) 1-0 win over Amal Atbara, and concluded on November 17 with 1-1 draw between Al-Hilal Omdurman and Al-Merreikh.
Al-Merreikh were crowned champions.

Team information

Last updated: 6 April 2009

Final standings

Scorers

Last updated November 17, 2008.

References

External links
 FIFA.com
 
 http://www.goalzz.com/main.aspx?c=4299&stage=1

Sudan Premier League seasons
Sudan
Sudan
football